Prionyx is a genus of wasps in the family Sphecidae. They are known to hunt and feed on grasshoppers.

Behavior 
Prior to laying their eggs the female Prionyx stings a grasshopper causing paralysis. She will then bury the grasshopper in a burrow she has excavated, lay an egg on the body, and then seal the burrow. When the egg develops it feeds on the grasshopper until it has matured, and then pupates.

Name Origin
The name Prionyx comes from the Greek words "Prion" (Saw) and "Onyx/Onychus" (Claw), which refers to the saw-like endings on the creature's legs.

Species
These 59 species belong to the genus Prionyx:

 Prionyx afghaniensis (de Beaumont, 1970) i c g
 Prionyx atratus (Lepeletier de Saint Fargeau, 1845) i c g b
 Prionyx bifoveolatus (Taschenberg, 1869) i c g
 Prionyx binghami Jha and Farooqi, 1996 i c g
 Prionyx canadensis (Provancher, 1887) i c g b
 Prionyx chilensis (Spinola, 1851) i c g
 Prionyx chobauti (Roth, 1925) i c g
 Prionyx crudelis (F. Smith, 1856) i c g
 Prionyx damascenus (de Beaumont, 1968) i c g
 Prionyx elegantulus (R. Turner, 1912) i c g
 Prionyx erythrogaster (Rohwer, 1913) i c g
 Prionyx fervens (Linnaeus, 1758) i c g b
 Prionyx foxi Bohart & Menke, 1963 i c g b
 Prionyx fragilis (Nurse, 1903) i c g
 Prionyx funebris (Berland, 1926) i c g
 Prionyx globosus (F. Smith, 1856) i c g
 Prionyx gobiensis (Tsuneki, 1971) i c g
 Prionyx guichardi (de Beaumont, 1967) i c g
 Prionyx haberhaueri (Radoszkowski, 1871) i c g
 Prionyx herrerai (Brèthes, 1926) i c g
 Prionyx indus (Linnaeus, 1758) i c g
 Prionyx insignis (Kohl, 1885) i c g
 Prionyx judaeus (de Beaumont, 1968) i c g
 Prionyx kirbii (Vander Linden, 1827) i c g
 Prionyx kurdistanicus (Balthasar, 1954) i c g
 Prionyx leuconotus (F. Morawitz, 1890) i c g
 Prionyx lividocinctus (A. Costa, 1861) i c g
 Prionyx macula (Fabricius, 1804) i c g
 Prionyx melanotus (F. Morawitz, 1890) i c g
 Prionyx neoxenus (Kohl, 1890) i c g
 Prionyx nigropectinatus (Taschenberg, 1869) i c g
 Prionyx niveatus (Dufour, 1854) i c g
 Prionyx notinitidus (Willink, 1951) i c g
 Prionyx nudatus (Kohl, 1885) i c g
 Prionyx parkeri Bohart & Menke, 1963 i c g b
 Prionyx persicus (Mocsáry, 1883) i c g
 Prionyx popovi Guichard, 1988 i c g
 Prionyx pseudostriatus (Giner Marí, 1944) i c g
 Prionyx pumilio (Taschenberg, 1869) i c g
 Prionyx radoszkowskyi (Kohl, 1888) i c g
 Prionyx reymondi (Roth, 1954) i c g
 Prionyx saevus (F. Smith, 1856) i c g
 Prionyx semistriatus (Schrottky, 1920) i c g
 Prionyx senegalensis (Arnold, 1951) i c g
 Prionyx senilis (Morice, 1911) i c g
 Prionyx sennae (Mantero, 1901) i c g
 Prionyx simillimus (Fernald, 1907) i c g
 Prionyx sirdariensis (Radoszkowski, 1877) i c g
 Prionyx songaricus (Eversmann, 1849) i c g
 Prionyx stschurowskii (Radoszkowski, 1877) i c g
 Prionyx subatratus (R. Bohart, 1958) i c g
 Prionyx subfuscatus (Dahlbom, 1845) i c g
 Prionyx sundewalli (Dahlbom, 1845) i c g
 Prionyx thomae (Fabricius, 1775) i c g
 Prionyx trichargyrus (Spinola, 1839) i c g
 Prionyx viduatus (Christ, 1791) i c g
 Prionyx vittatus (Kohl, 1884) i c g
 Prionyx xanthabdominalis Li and Yang, 1995 i c g
 Prionyx zarudnyi (Gussakovskij, 1933) i c g

Data sources: i = ITIS, c = Catalogue of Life, g = GBIF, b = Bugguide.net

References

Sphecidae
Apoidea genera